Philmont Scout Ranch is a ranch located in Colfax County, New Mexico, near the village of Cimarron; it covers  of wilderness in the Sangre de Cristo Mountains on the east side of the Cimarron Range of the Rocky Mountains. Donated by oil baron Waite Phillips, the ranch is owned and operated by the Boy Scouts of America. It is a National High Adventure Base where crews of Scouts and Venturers take part in backpacking treks and other outdoor activities. By land area, it is one of the largest youth camps in the world. During the 2019 season, between June 8 and August 22, an estimated 24,000 Scouts and adult leaders backpacked through the Ranch's extensive backcountry. That same year 1,302 staff were responsible for the Ranch's summer operations.

Philmont is also home to the Philmont Training Center, the National Scouting Museum and the Seton Memorial Library. The Training Center is the primary location for BSA's national volunteer training programs. Philmont is a working ranch, maintaining small herds of cattle, horses, burros, and bison.

The only documented Tyrannosaurus rex track in the world was discovered within the camp's boundaries in 1993 in North Ponil Canyon by the Anasazi Trail Camp. It was formally identified in 1994.

There are three other high adventure camps that the BSA owns and maintains: the Northern Tier National High Adventure Bases in Minnesota, as well as Manitoba and Ontario in Canada; Florida National High Adventure Sea Base in the Florida Keys; and Summit Bechtel Family National Scout Reserve in southern West Virginia.

Location and geography

Philmont is located in the Sangre de Cristo Mountains of the Rocky Mountains of New Mexico. The closest village is Cimarron, New Mexico. The address of the ranch is usually given as 17 Deer Run Rd., Cimarron, New Mexico, 87714. There are no mountains to the south or east of Philmont. The interior of the ranch is mountainous but a small part of the eastern area is prairie.

Aside from Baldy, the ranch contains a number of prominent peaks. The South Country is home to a series of six difficult peaks, namely Mount Phillips, Comanche Peak, Big Red, Bear Mountain, Black Mountain, and Schaefers Peak, as well as Trail Peak, which is popular for its nearness to Beaubien, and the wreckage of the crash of a B-24 bomber in 1942 near its summit. Of the ranch's various peaks with trail access, Black Mountain is widely considered the most difficult, followed closely by Baldy and Big Red.

Tooth of Time Ridge, and the latitude line on which it sits, marks the boundary between the central and southern sections of Philmont. The boundary between the central and northern sections is around U.S. Route 64, which runs just south of the narrowest part of the 'I'-shape, which is only a few miles across. Other prominent landmarks on the ranch include Grizzly Tooth, Window Rock, Deer Lake Mesa, Wilson's Mesa and Urraca Mesa.

History
Native Americans of the Jicarilla Apache tribe and Ute tribe once inhabited Philmont. A few Native American archaeological sites exist in the northern section nearby the 'Indian Writings' camp, and various camps seek to preserve Philmont's Native American heritage.

On April 22, 1942, a B-24 Liberator crashed into the side of Trail Peak. Waite Philips led a rescue crew up, but the seven men on board died on impact. Among the casualties was Eagle Scout Roland L. Jeffries and Star Scout Charles O. Reynard Jr. Some of the wreckage still remains, including a wing and propeller, and because of its location, it is the world's most visited airplane crash site.

Private ownership

The Santa Fe Trail crossed the plains just southwest of Philmont in the mid-1800s. The Tooth of Time owes its name to this trail; travelers knew that once they passed it, they had only one week to go until they reached Santa Fe, New Mexico. Philmont's strategic location along the trail spurred some interest in it. In 1841, Carlos Beaubien and Guadalupe Miranda obtained a large land grant from the Mexican government, including the present ranch. Soon the grant fell into the hands of Beaubien's son-in-law Lucien Maxwell, who played an important role in developing and settling it. Maxwell sold the ranch to the Maxwell Land Grant and Railroad Company, which gave up and handed it on to a Dutch development company, which decided to parcel it out to ranchers.

One of the most prominent ranchers was Jesus Gil Abreu, who ran the Abreu Rayado Ranch from the 1870s to his death in 1901. Operating from the Rayado Settlement, he raised cattle, goats, and sheep and grew crops. The family owned this property until 1911, when they sold most of it off. One of the sons remained on the ranch near the site of Abreu, a present staffed camp, and his homestead was preserved for years. The building was made of adobe, was abandoned and eventually collapsed. The foundation of this building now serves as the foundation for the Abreu cantina. The house was reconstructed in 1998 about  uphill.

The history of mining at Philmont dates back to the years immediately after the Civil War. U.S. soldiers were stationed in the West after the war, as the U.S. Army was driving out the Native Americans in the United States. The story is that some of these soldiers stationed at Fort Union traded with Native Americans for copper float. According to the story, some of the soldiers went up Baldy Mountain in 1866 in search of this copper but found gold. They could not stay to mine the gold due to the approaching winter and the area was overrun by miners by the time they returned in the spring. Scores of gold mines were excavated and operated into the early 20th century on what was once the Baldy Mining District, now modern day Philmont. It is a common joke at Philmont that some day the mines under Baldy will collapse and Phillips will be the highest mountain in Philmont. The Contention Mine, located at Cyphers Mine, and the Aztec Mine, located at French Henry, are open to guided tours.

Phillips built a large residence in the lowlands of Philmont. He turned the ranch into a private game reserve for himself and friends, and built a number of hunting lodges and day-use camps. He chose not to provide electricity at the remote camps. A few of these original camps, including Fish Camp and the Hunting Lodge, have been preserved, complete with wood-burning stoves, oil lamps, and unique design features indicative of Phillips's often eccentric taste.

Donated to Boy Scouts
Phillips sometimes allowed others, including a few Boy Scout troops, to visit his ranch. He was so impressed with the Scouts that in 1938, during the Great Depression, he donated  of his land to the Boy Scouts of America. His only condition was that the property be used "for the benefit of the members of the Boy Scout organization".  He donated a second, larger section of land later in the 1930s, requiring only that this section pay its fair share of taxes on any portion devoted to competitive commercial operations.

Contrary to popular belief, Phillips did not donate his entire ranch to the Boy Scouts, but only that portion of the property that provided the most recreational value. The total donation comprised about 40% of the ranch. To help fund maintenance of Philmont, he also donated the Philtower office building in Tulsa, Oklahoma. In 1963, vice-president of the National Council Norton Clapp contributed funds to purchase another  of land within the Maxwell Land Grant, consisting of the Baldy Mountain mining area. In 2015, the Boy Scouts of America purchased  that was once operated as a camp called Cimarroncita Ranch.

In 1989, the Boy Scouts obtained a renewable special use permit to the Valle Vidal Unit of the Carson National Forest from the United States Forest Service. This allowed Scouts to hike and camp in the area. Philmont operates three staffed camps—Whiteman Vega, Seally Canyon, and Ring Place—and two trail camps in that area. Those camps serve around 3,000 Scouts each summer. In return, each camper is asked to contribute three hours of conservation work in the Valle on projects approved by the Forest Service.

Rich Cabins, a historical farming cabin on Ted Turner's Vermejo Park Ranch, is operated as a staff camp.

Camp name
The camp was initially named the "Philturn Rockymountain Scoutcamp". The word 'Philturn' is derived from Waite Phillips' name, together with the "Good Turn" he did by donating the property. The ranch's name was changed to the "Philmont Scout Ranch and Explorer Base".

Early organization
In its early days, Philmont had a half dozen "base camps" constructed at strategic locations. Visiting Scouts lived at one of these camps for a week and could take day hikes to surrounding locations. To visit a different area, the Scouts packed their gear onto burros and hiked to another base camp. Today the program is based on backpacking, and Scouts carry all their gear, living in tents while on expedition.

Programs and activities

Trek
The standard and most popular Philmont program is the backpacking trek. In recent years, the option of 7 and 9-day treks has proved to be popular as well. Every year, about 30 different trek itineraries are offered, ranging from "challenging" to "super strenuous." The individual routes may change each year based on feedback from staff as well as campers.

Each trek covers distinct regions, peaks, and camps. A group of Scouts on a trek is called a crew; most crews are assembled in their local council by troops, Venturing crews, or the council itself. A crew consists of four to ten Scouts, accompanied by two to four adult leaders. Some of the Scouts within the crew are designated as the chaplain's aide, Wilderness Pledge Guide, and the crew leader. A contingent consists of one or more crews from the same council (see Boy Scouts of America: Organization), traveling together. Sister crews are crews that may follow different itineraries but are from the same troop or contingent. Around 360 participants arrive at base camp every day in the peak of the season. The first crews depart with their guide, known as a Ranger, in the second week of June, and the last crews depart in the second week of August.

Trek experience

Crews travel to Philmont on their own via aircraft, chartered bus, or Amtrak, to the cities near Philmont. The Southwest Chief runs between Los Angeles Union Station and Chicago Union Station, and serves a station in Raton.  Scouts can take a shuttle from the Amtrak station to Philmont.  Private plane service operates at Raton Municipal Airport, but no commercial flights land there. Nearby commercial airports are the Albuquerque International Sunport, Santa Fe Municipal Airport, Denver International Airport, Colorado Springs Airport, and Pueblo Memorial Airport, with service to Denver. Commercial chartered buses are available to and from the airports and some cities. Some crews elect to drive by themselves.

A typical crew arrives in Base Camp, checks in at the Welcome Center, and meets its Ranger, a trained staff member from the Ranger Department. They will assist the crew in the various Base Camp processing procedures, which consist of completing all paperwork at Registration, verifying their itinerary with Logistics, checking out gear at Outfitting Services (such as a dining fly, bear ropes, bear bags, and water purification tablets), and receiving health checks at the Infirmary.

A crew also receives several days' worth of trail food, packaged in bags which feed two people each; the exact quantity depends on the crew's itinerary and the day on which it is scheduled to reach the next commissary (see below), but is usually three days worth of food. Scouts with diet needs are required to bring their own food. Philmont also provides optional cooking supplies.

The crew spends its first night in the trailbound side of Tent City, where the trekkers sleep in canvas tents. The next morning, they eat breakfast at the dining hall, have their crew photo taken, and board a bus to one of the ranch's several trailheads (called "turnarounds" because they consist of a loop in the road for the bus to turn around).

The Ranger verifies the trekkers' general backpacking knowledge and teaches them specific Philmont procedures, such as bear bags and latrine (known as 'red roofs') usage. Participants are encouraged not to urinate in the latrines. According to Philmont staff, this breaks down feces in the latrines, making the smell more noticeable. First thing after reaching a camp, the crew sets up a bear bag by throwing ropes over preplaced horizontal cables stretching between trees. The bag is then filled with all of the food not being prepared until later days on the trail. The bag is then secured to the rope, and hoisted into the air. The rope is secured to two different anchor points (trees, etc.) with sticks placed underneath the ropes to protect any flora used in the process. After preparing, eating, and cleaning dinner, food particles and any other smellable items not placed in the first bear bag are then raised in the second bear bag (known as the 'oops bag') which is suspended from a carabiner on the top of the rope that is attached to the original bear bag. Rangers stay with their crews on the trail for two days and depart on the morning of the third day. In the next eight days the crew will hike through the Philmont wilderness, staying at various staffed camps and unstaffed "trail camps" scattered about the Ranch. On the final day, the crew returns to Base Camp, sometimes by bus from a turnaround or by climbing over the Tooth of Time and hiking directly into Base Camp. During the final day at Base Camp, the crew cleans up, returns any Philmont-issued supplies, and attends the closing campfire.

Conservation Department
There are six divisions of the Conservation Department in the summer, each led by an Associate Director of Conservation - Work Crew, Forestry Crew, Conservationists, GIS, Environmental Education (ROCS, Trail Crew Trek), and Order of the Arrow Trail Crew. Work Crews are staff groups who are responsible for maintaining and creating campsites and trails. Trail Crews and other staff known as Advanced Teams are the first Conservation staffers to begin hiking and clearing the trails, one month prior to the first participants' arrival.  Conservationists live in staff camps or spike camps and lead conservation projects for treks passing through their camp. The GIS staff map trails, campsites, and other features of the Philmont Backcountry.  In recognition of the 100th anniversary of the BSA, Northrop Grumman donated high-resolution geospatial data of the ranch to Philmont. GIS and the Conservation Department use the data to create enhanced maps and improve conservation efforts throughout the ranch. The Division of Forestry's priority is forest fuels reduction. Using chainsaws, a masticator, a skidder, and a portable sawmill, these crews create defensible space around staff camps and strategic shaded fuel breaks to reduce the risk of catastrophic wildfire and improve the health and productivity of Philmont's forests while utilizing the wood in construction projects around the Ranch. Slash from the thinning projects is piled and burned and a prescribed fire program is being developed to maintain desired forest condition. The Forestry crews work year-round, and each staff member receives detailed training in chainsaw operations, as well as an overview of forest management and fire ecology.

Roving Outdoor Conservation School
The Roving Outdoor Conservation School (ROCS), started in 2000, is a twenty-one day trek program that is open to males and females between the ages of sixteen and twenty-one. ROCS is an educational backpacking experience rooted in conservation and environmental science education.  Throughout the trek participants have lessons rooted in environmental science, visits from guest speakers, and the opportunity to work on conservation projects with the Philmont Conservation Department and the U.S. Forest Service in the Valle Vidal Unit of the Carson National Forest. While on the trail participants learn about ecology, botany, dendrology, geology, hydrology, forestry, soil science, fire ecology, environmental policy, leave no trace principles, environmental ethics, conservation techniques, and wildlife, range, and land management practices. Participants tackle conservation projects ranging from trailbuilding to meadow encroachment to timber stand improvement to erosion control to streambed restoration.  Participants are exposed to the land management challenges facing the West, as well as the rest of America. The program focuses on empowering participants so that they may transfer what they learn on the trail to their lives back home.

Trail Crew Trek
Trail Crew Trek is a fourteen-day education experience rooted in service through conservation. Participants build trail for seven days and then go on a seven-day educational trek throughout Philmont, involving hands-on experience with a variety of conservation projects on the ranch and visits from guest speakers involved in conservation and resource management.

Order of the Arrow Trail Crew
Order of the Arrow Trail Crew is a fourteen-day program for Order of the Arrow members aged 16 to 21 that gives participants an opportunity to work on various conservation projects around the ranch. Order of the Arrow Trail Crews follow the same format as Trail Crew Treks - one week building trail and then a self-planned, week-long trek. Many Order of the Arrow lodges and sections offer scholarships to Order of the Arrow members.

Rayado Program

The Rayado program is a select, strenuous twenty day backpacking program designed for experienced Scouts. Rayado crews are accompanied by two rangers and experience a number of challenges geared toward developing personal growth, a sense of stewardship for the environment, and leadership skills. Rayado participants are challenged physically, mentally, and spiritually as they hike Philmont's most challenging trails, visit parts of the backcountry that are never seen by regular trek participants, and take part in activities that are not available to other Scouts. This includes difficult rock climbing and instruction in outdoor leadership, wilderness problem-solving, and advanced outdoor skills which include wilderness backpacking, navigation and travel, expeditio behavior and group dynamics, advanced cooking, wilderness stewardship, and wilderness first aid and backcountry emergency procedures. A Rayado Trek encourages personal growth, teamwork, and leadership ability.

Participants must be at least 15 and less than 21 years old, be in excellent physical condition, and skilled in Leave No Trace camping. Applicants must submit a letter of recommendation from an adult Scouter detailing their character and back country experience. Applications must be approved by a parent or guardian, a unit leader, and the local council executive. During 2019, two Rayado programs are scheduled. The cost per person is $800 in 2019 and $845 in 2020. Rayado scholarships, presented by the Philmont Staff Association, are annually awarded to deserving campers who wish to take part in the Rayado program. Scholarships generally cover the full cost of the Rayado Program, but a number of smaller partial scholarships are also available and all Rayado participants are encouraged to apply. Transportation to and from Philmont is the responsibility of the camper and is not covered in the scholarships.

Rayado crews are put together by Philmont staff and consist of people from different parts of the country. A person may only be a Rayado participant once; a ranger may only be assigned to a Rayado crew once; and staff members are disqualified from participation in Rayado treks except as rangers.

The Rayado Program was once known as the Kit Carson Program.

Ranger Department

The Ranger Department was founded in 1957 by Clarence E. Dunn, Jack Rhea and Dr. Ray Loomis, the former of which served as chief ranger for 14 years. Rangers are responsible for ensuring that all participants know all required skills and procedures needed for backcountry treks, and for coaching the youth leadership to help them develop their skills and confidence and have a successful trek. They hike along with crews on the 12-day treks for the first two days on the trail, during which time they teach and observe the crew. They are also responsible for Search and rescue on Philmont property and in surrounding areas. The Ranger Department also includes Mountain Trek Rangers who lead the week-long Mountain Treks that originate in the Philmont Training Center.

Ranger Trainers, experienced staff who have finished one or more seasons as a Ranger, train and supervise Rangers. Each trainer oversees from 8-10 Rangers in a Ranger Training Crew and are expected to lead two backpacking crews per summer. In the summer of 2013 there were roughly 240 people in the ranger department, organized into 25 training crews.  Upper ranger leadership consists of coordinators for the Rayado, Mountain Trek, Service Academy, and scheduling programs, four Associate Chief Rangers, and the Chief Ranger. During the summer of 2007, the Philmont Staff Association coordinated a 50th Anniversary Ranger Reunion at the ranch. Over 300 former Rangers attended this event.

Ranch Hands
A program in which young men and women can earn a discounted eight-day Cavalcade trek at Philmont by participating in an eight-day work session. Participants work with the Horse Department staff taking care of Philmont's 250 head of horses and 80 head of burros. Participants help by hauling hay and feed, saddling horses, helping keep the horses shod, and assisting on Philmont trail rides. The work can be strenuous and requires top physical and mental conditioning. After the eight-day work session, the Ranch Hands crew gathers together and embarks on an eight-day Cavalcade under the leadership of a Horseman and Wrangler.

National Advanced Youth Leadership Experience

National Advanced Youth Leadership Experience (NAYLE) is a high-intensity Boy Scout leadership course taught at Philmont Scout Ranch. It is based on backcountry high adventure skills and began in the summer of 2006 replacing the previous National Junior Leader Instructor Course. The course is available to Boy Scouts and Venturers aged 14 through 20 who have completed their local council National Youth Leadership Training (NYLT) course and is held during six one-week sessions. Based at Philmont's Rayado Ridge Leadership Camp and taught at various locations across Philmont Scout Ranch, the program hones youth leadership skills through ethical decision making and participation in Philmont Ranger backcountry training.

Kanik
Kanik (Inuit qanik for "snowflake") is the winter camping program of Philmont Scout Ranch. This cold weather camping program is based on a similar program called Okpik at Charles L. Sommers in Ely, Minnesota, part of the BSA's Northern Tier National High Adventure Bases. The main goal of the program is to teach participating crews how to camp comfortably in the cold winter months. Philmont has had a winter camping program since 1982, but it wasn't until 1990 that the more expanded Kanik program began. Kanik is considered as one of Philmont's two second season programs; the other being Autumn Adventure.

Attending Kanik 
Sessions for the Kanik program are available from December 28 to March 31. Between Christmas and New Year's Day a special discounted holiday trek is offered. Weather conditions vary; if there is adequate snow for cross-country skiing, then crews are given the opportunity to hike in the Philmont backcountry.  The program allows for weekend treks, however, Philmont recommends that crews plan to attend for 3 to 4 days to become fully trained and fully participate in winter activities.  Crew sizes usually range from 6-10 with 2 adult advisors required to participate.  Generally, the maximum number of total participants for each session is limited to 40 participants or 4 crews; unlike the several thousand participants during Philmont's summer season.  This is done in part to insure safe evacuation out of the backcountry in the event of a blizzard.

Program options 
On the first night crews arrive, they are housed indoors in dorm rooms at Philmont's Base Camp.  Subsequent nights are spent in the Philmont backcountry in tents (or in snow shelters if conditions permit) often at Miranda or sometimes the Hunting Lodge.  After an initial period of training led by trained Kanik guides, several program options are available to each crew depending upon its interest and the weather and snow conditions.  Some program options include: cross-country skiing, snow camping, winter ecology, hiking, and the use of winter tools and equipment.  In 2004, a down hill ski package was added to the program options.  For an extra fee crews can add a day of down hill skiing/snowboarding to their trek at Angel Fire Ski Resort that includes all meals, housing, a 2-hour ski lesson, lift ticket, and ski equipment rental.  This added ski package is not available to crews on the holiday trek.

Awards 
Each participant who completes training is awarded a distinctive patch as a remembrance of Philmont Kanik.  Much like the Philmont arrowhead patch awarded after the completion of a Philmont summer trek and service project, the Kanik patch can only be earned.

Other programs
 Cavalcades are similar to standard treks, but are conducted on horseback. The packing restrictions are even more intense than a regular trek as participants are only allowed one standard sleeping bag stuff sacks to pack everything into, including their sleeping bags. The participants focus more on horse care than on other programs at the camp, though they still do take part in many other activities. Calvalcades last only 7 days total, with 2 days being in base camp.
 Mountain Treks are six-day backpacking experiences for youth PTC participants.
 Philmont Autumn Adventure program
 Guided activities such as fishing, winter camping, and skiing, are offered throughout the year.

Historic programs

Philbreak
The Philbreak program ran from 2003 to 2009, and returned in 2019. It was an 'alternative spring break' program started in 2003 to help restore Philmont Scout Ranch after devastating forest fires. From 2004 to 2007, the participants worked on the Urraca Trail, which is intended as a day hike for those attending the Philmont Training Center. Participants in the seven-day program were expected to work eight- or nine-hour days in all types of conditions. The program took place during three separate weeks during March. Participants also had an opportunity to take a ski break at Angel Fire. In 2008, the design of the program switched to mirror that of Philmont's Kanik. Participants spent three days and two nights in Philmont's backcountry as well as provided service on the final day. The program ended in 2010. In 2019, after the Ute Park Fire  in 2018, Philbreak returned with four week-long sessions in March to help with fire mitigation.

Philmont facilities

Camps

Philmont operates from one large base camp, including Camping Headquarters, the National Scouting Museum, the Philmont Training Center and Villa Philmonte, fire response facilities, cattle headquarters, and an administration area. During the 2012 season there were 34 staffed camps and 77 unstaffed or "trail camps". Only some trail camps have a potable water source. Camps without water are referred to as "dry camps". Old camps are closed or relocated and new camps are opened every few years. Some camp sites are closed due to changing safety protocols. For example, camps were once located on top of Urraca Mesa and in the Baldy Saddle but these are unlikely to reopen because the locations are at risk for lightning strikes.

Commissaries
Campers and hikers initially obtain camping food from the services building at Base Camp. Commissaries at Philmont are usually a small warehouse that is stocked weekly with trail food for campers, groceries for backcountry staff, and various other supplies. Some commissaries include a trading post that sells a small variety of odds and ends, including postcards, postage, and games, along with repair kits, white gas for crews' stoves, and other backpacking necessities. To limit the quantity and weight of consumables carried by a crew, most crews stop at a commissary every 3–4 days to replenish their food supplies.
Commissaries are located at Baldy Town, Phillips Junction, Ute Gulch, Ponil, Apache Springs, Rich Cabins, Ring Place, and Miners Park.

Kit Carson Museum
Interpreters demonstrate 1850s period frontier skills and crafts including blacksmithing, cooking, shooting and farming. The museum also features exhibits about frontiersmen Kit Carson and Lucien Maxwell who founded a colony at Rayado.

Chase Ranch
Starting Nov. 1, 2013, Philmont Scout Ranch started running the adjacent Chase Ranch. The ranch is near the Ponil Creek, a mile north of the Cimarron River. Chase Ranch, like Philmont, is a working cattle ranch with Herefords, that were introduced to the ranch in 1883.
 
Gretchen Sammis Chase started Chase Ranch Foundation with the goal of educating young people in the ranching experience.

Chapels
Philmont has a Protestant, Catholic, Church of Jesus Christ of Latter-day Saints, and Jewish Chapel at the Camping Headquarters. There is an interfaith chapel at the Philmont Training Center. There are also several chapels in the backcountry.

In the Rayado campground, Philmont has the Chapel of the Holy Child, on the east side of State Road 21 in the old town of Rayado, New Mexico.

National Scouting Museum

In 2018, the National Scouting Museum opened at Philmont.

The National Scouting Museum features exhibits about the Boy Scouts of America, Philmont history, and the history, art, and natural history of the area.

Housed within the National Scouting Museum, the Seton Memorial Library contains the library, personal art, and natural history collections of a co-founder of the Boy Scouts of America, Ernest Thompson Seton.  This research library contains Seton's personal collection and an extensive collection of volumes pertaining to western lore and the history of the area.

Awards
By meeting the challenge of Philmont, participants are considered to be worthy of awards. The awards represent the Philmont experience that can never be sold or traded; only earned.

Arrowhead Award
An individual camper award is presented by their adult adviser when they have:
 Attended opening campfire--"The New Mexico Story."
 Completed a Philmont-approved itinerary with your crew.
 Completed three hours of staff supervised conservation work or a camp improvement project on Philmont and took advantage of every opportunity to learn about and improve our ecology, and practiced the art of outdoor living in ways that minimize pollution of soil, water, and air.
 Fulfilled the personal commitment to the Wilderness Pledge.
 Lived the Scout Oath and Law

50-Miler Award
All Philmont itineraries can qualify crew members for the 50-Miler Award as it relates to distance. 3 of the 10 required service hours must be done at Philmont. Even if the award's requirements are completed at Philmont, the unit's leader must file an application for the group at their local council's service center.

"We All Made It"

The "We All Made It" plaque (WAMI Award) is an award presented by Philmont to each crew (leader) that:
 Demonstrated good camping practices and Scouting spirit.
 Followed an approved itinerary and camped only when scheduled.
 Fulfilled the commitment to the Wilderness Pledge.
 Took advantage of every opportunity to learn about and improve our ecology, and practiced the art of outdoor living in ways that minimize pollution of soil, water, and air.

Wilderness Pledge Guia

Philmont has asked each participant to sign the Philmont Wilderness Pledge which declares that he or she will do everything possible to preserve the beauty and wonder of the Philmont Wilderness and neighboring properties through good Scout Camping. Youth Crew members and adults are eligible to participate in the program.

The Wilderness Pledge includes Ranger-led training in all Philmont camping practices, including Leave No Trace, information on Philmont bear and wildlife procedures, daily discussions on the trail that focus on each of the seven principles of Leave No Trace, and to give three hours of conservation work under the direction of a member of the Philmont Staff. (This requirement is also one of the requirements to earn the Philmont Arrowhead Patch. These hours count for both awards.)

Duty to God Award
Under the guidance of a crew chaplain's aide, each participant in a trek may work to fulfill the requirements of the Duty to God Award. Requirements include attendance at a religious service, participation in at least three daily devotionals and leading Grace before a meal.

Previous awards

The "P", "Dollar", or "Silver Dollar" patch set was available from 1942 through 1956. The full set consisted of the base round "P" Philmont patch ringed by six specialty segment awards, plus additional staff and "Mountainman" segments below the ring of segments. The ring segments included a Sportsman segment for shooting field sports, a Camper (black pot) segment for woods housekeeping (precursor to Leave No Trace), a Horseman yellow spur segment, a beaver lodge Conservation segment, and Woodsman and Naturalist segments. Below that ring was the coveted Mountainman award for those who completed multiple requirements while attending for three years, and who "have proven themselves to be in love with the out-of-doors".

Philmont traditions

Philmont Hymn
The "Philmont Hymn" is the ranch's official song and was written by John Benton Westfall (1928-May 9, 2009) in 1947 when he was 19. Westfall was the lone staffer at Visto Grande (then called Cimarron Bench Camp) at the time. Westfall, who at the time was a student at Pittsburg State University wrote the song on a trip home to Kansas on a train from Philmont influenced by the "click-click, click-click" of the tracks. He later became a professional Scouter in Iowa, Kansas, and Oklahoma and worked as a salesman for Phillips Petroleum.

<blockquote><poem>Silver on the sage,
Starlit skies above,
Aspen-covered hills,
Country that I love.Philmont, here's to thee,
Scouting paradise,
Out in God's country,
Tonight.

Wind in whispering pines,
Eagle soaring high,
Purple mountains rise,
Against an azure sky.Philmont, here's to thee,
Scouting paradise,
Out in God's country,
Tonight.</poem></blockquote>

Philmont Grace
The "Philmont Grace" (also known as the Worth Ranch Grace or simply the Wilderness Grace) is a prayer recited before meals at many Boy Scout camps and events around the U.S. It was originally written in 1929 by A. J. Fulkerson, Camp Director at Worth Ranch Scout Camp in Palo Pinto County, Texas.

The version of the grace, as it is used at Philmont, is:

For food, for raiment,
For life, for opportunity,
For friendship and fellowship,
We thank Thee, O Lord. Amen.

Ranger Bell

The bell located in front of the camper dining hall is used by the Rangers before lunch and dinner. Four Rangers climb on the bell where one of them tells a story that ends with "and all I could think about was ..." At this point, all the Rangers present break out in the Ranger Song. During the song, the four Rangers conduct a trust fall. The teller of the story ends by ringing the bell.Ranger Song''
I want to go back to Philmont,
I want to go back to Philmont
Where the old Rayado flows, 
Where the rain come a seepin' 
In the tent where you're a sleepin' 
And the waters say hello

I want to wake up in the morning 
With my socks all wringing wet, 
For it brings back fondest memories, 
That a Ranger can't forget.

I want to hike once more the canyon floor 
From Scribblins to Old Camp, 
With my pack sack a-creakin', 
And my back with sweat a-reekin', 
And my legs begin to cramp.

I want to hike again with such great men 
As made those famous treks,
From Beaubien to Porky
And from Cito to Car-Max

Natural disasters

1960 tornado
On June 25, 1960, a Fujita scale F0 tornado swept through Philmont's base camp area, downing about 300 tents located on a flat near Ranch Headquarters and depositing camping gear over Tooth of Time Ridge. Four 1960 National Jamboree troops from New Mexico—Troops 78, 79, 80 and 82—had gathered at Philmont for a shakedown camp.  Three other New Mexico troops had gone to Camp Zia for their shakedown. The troops each had 32 boys, two Assistant Scout Masters and one Scout Master.  Troops were camping in wall tents which they had decorated before going to the Jamboree.  Each wall tent had a wooden frame with a thick wooden roof pole for support.  The boys were learning how to cook over charcoal fires and the fires had just been started for the evening meal. The twister arrived without warning.  As the wind suddenly increased, boys ran to secure the tents, but to no avail.  The winds swept up tents, fires, men and boys, rolling nearby automobiles and leveling the camp.  Injuries included broken bones, blunt force injuries from flying debris—including shattered roof poles—and burns from charcoal fires and equipment ignited by the fires. The twister also leveled a nearly completed cinder block chapel. After the passage of the storm, gear and equipment could be seen in the funnel cloud as it left the area.  Camping equipment was found as far as 14 miles away from the campsite and was recovered by ranch hands. Boys were housed for the night in other facilities, and the next day boys passed among piles of recovered equipment to reclaim what they could. Although there were no fatalities, 33 Boy Scouts and a Scout leader received injuries.

1965 flash flood
On June 17, 1965, a large flash flood occurred at Philmont. Heavy rain throughout the area caused waters in Rayado Canyon and the Cimarron River to rise to extreme levels; up to 12.42 feet at the highest. After June 17, water levels gradually decreased over the course of several days. The impacts of the flood included the destruction of several campsites and the loss of many old photographs and documents kept at Philmont, however no injuries or deaths resulted from the flood. The flood occurred during an El Niño year.

Ponil Complex Fire

The Ponil Complex Fire started on June 2, 2002 and burned until June 17. One third of the burn zone was totally burned while another third was only lightly to moderately burned. About one third of the burn zone escaped relatively unharmed, due to being sections of valleys that the fire jumped over or being not as dried out and likely to burn because of nearby water.

The burn zone is currently revegetating, some areas of which were reseeded while others began recovering naturally.

2015 flash flood

On the morning of June 27, 2015, heavy rain occurred in a great portion of Philmont, causing a flash flood. The flood also affected some other nearby areas in Colfax County that morning, including highways and small towns around Philmont. One youth Scout, Alden Brock, who was situated in a campsite within the staff camp Indian Writings, drowned while being swept away by the flood and died. Alden's death received nationwide attention, especially from the Scouting community.

Ute Park Fire

On May 31, 2018, a wildfire started one mile east of the community Ute Park, New Mexico. The cause remains under investigation. Twelve structures at Philmont, all unoccupied and non-residential, were reported as burned. All backcountry treks at Philmont Scout Ranch for the entire 2018 summer season were cancelled, though PTC courses—including the National Advanced Youth Leadership Experience—remained in session. The fire burned a total of 26,000 acres at Philmont, damaging 200 campsites.

Cooks Peak Fire 
On April 17, 2022, a wildfire started 10 miles south of the Kit Carson Museum at Rayado. Heavily impacted areas of the fire include northern Mora county and southern Colfax county. The cause still remains under investigation. Zastrow Cabin, which was located in Philmont's south country, was destroyed. Philmont staff along with wildland firefighter personnel have wrapped the Fish camp Cabin, as well as other buildings within the south country.  The fire was largely contained before the season began, allowing crews to proceed with their treks as normal.

Notable former staff
 Wally Berg – Ranger in the 1970s and Director of Conservation; first American to summit Lhotse in 1990.
 Steve Fossett – Ranger in 1961; also served on the Philmont Ranch Committee, Later a record-breaking aviator.
 Donald Rumsfeld – 1949 guide (forerunner to the Rangers), later United States Secretary of Defense.
R.W. Hampton – Wrangler from 1974–1976; cowboy and later a nationally recognized singer.
David Goldfein – Ranger in 1980; US Air Force General and 21st Chief of Staff of the United States Air Force.

Astronaut training

NASA and the USGS used the site to geologically train the Apollo Astronauts in June 1964.  In the words of Phinney, the site was "...probably more like lunar geology."  Training included recognizing "both igneous and sedimentary rocks, orientation with geologic maps, measuring and describing stratigraphic sections, strike and dip measurements, recording of field notes ... and geophysical traverses that included taking measurements with magnetometers, gravimeters and seismometers in an attempt to determine subsurface structure."  Astronauts who would use this training on the Moon included Apollo 11's Neil Armstrong and Buzz Aldrin, Apollo 12's Pete Conrad and Alan Bean, Apollo 15's David Scott, and Apollo 17's Gene Cernan.  Notable geologist instructors included G.D. Robinson.

2019 mortgage

Philmont was mortgaged in March 2019, from JPMorgan Chase.  Although the mortgage occurred in March 2019, members of the Philmont oversight community did not learn of it until approximately November 2019. An oversight committee member said that this violated agreements made when the land was donated in 1938. The BSA disputed his assertion.

See also
 Chase Ranch
 James P. Fitch
 Geography and ecology of Philmont Scout Ranch
 Girl Scout National Center West
 Mount Phillips (New Mexico)
 Vermejo Park Ranch 
 Wilderness Grace

References

Further reading

External links
  Villa Philmonte, National Scouting Museum, Chase Ranch, and Kit Carson Museum at Rayado
 
  Geologic history of Philmont Scout Ranch
  Database of Philmont trek itineraries
  First person interview with Elliot "Chope" and Virginia Phillips, son and daughter-in-law of Waite Phillips
 
 

 
Boy Scouts of America
Ranches in New Mexico